Nurzhan Karimzhanov (born 30 May 1980) is a Kazakhstani boxer, who won the gold medal at the 2002 Asian Games in the Junior Welterweight division.

Career
At the Olympics 2000 he fought at lightweight and beat among others local hero Michael Katsidis but lost to Andriy Kotelnyk. At the Asian Games he won the junior welterweight title.

Karimzhanov qualified for the Athens Games by ending up in second place at the 1st AIBA Asian 2004 Olympic Qualifying Tournament in Guangzhou, PR China. In the final he lost to Thailand's eventual gold medalist Manus Boonjumnong. At the Olympics 2004 he beat two opponents, but lost to Boris Georgiev 18:20.

References

External links
Yahoo

1980 births
Living people
Kazakhstani male boxers
Light-welterweight boxers
Olympic boxers of Kazakhstan
Boxers at the 2000 Summer Olympics
Boxers at the 2004 Summer Olympics
Asian Games medalists in boxing
Asian Games gold medalists for Kazakhstan
Boxers at the 2002 Asian Games
Medalists at the 2002 Asian Games